The Night Watchman is a 1938 Warner Bros. Merrie Melodies cartoon directed by Chuck Jones. The short was released on November 19, 1938.

This short is the first film directed by Chuck Jones after he was promoted from an animator (where he was under Fred Avery and Robert Clampett's units).

Plot
A feline watchman gets sick, so his kitten son is enlisted to watch the kitchen. When the gangland-style rats find out that he is the one on duty, they try to take over.

Home media
The Night Watchman is available with its original opening and ending titles restored on the Looney Tunes Golden Collection: Volume 4 Disc 4.

Voice cast
Mel Blanc as Hoodlum Rats, Tommy Cat (when he screams to the rats to quiet down)
Margaret Hill-Talbot as Tommy Cat
The Sportsmen as the singing rat quartet

References

External links
 

1938 animated films
Merrie Melodies short films
Warner Bros. Cartoons animated short films
Short films directed by Chuck Jones
1938 films
Vitaphone short films
Films scored by Carl Stalling
Animated films about cats
Films about mice and rats
Night in culture
1930s Warner Bros. animated short films
1930s English-language films